Maria Cristina Mel de Almeida Costa (born March 10, 1964) is a Brazilian singer, songwriter, Christian minister, teacher and missionary.  She made her recording debut in 1990 under the guidance of Bompastor executive Isaias Costa, and performed in gospel and secular media.

Biography
At age 16, after her parents' divorce, she was invited by a friend Gopel to attend a church in Rio de Janeiro, an American Christian group, The Continental Singers and Orchestra, under the pretext of practicing English. Mel became a Christian and "saw the bitterness of her life to become a honey". New heart, new life, with forgiveness, restoration, joy and peace. Cristina Mel had born just at that moment – as reported by herself.

After a 20-year career singing gospel and secular music, with national and international performances she has sold over five million copies, with gold in all the burned CDs without the awards have achieved with simple platinum and double platinum. Her musical career has reached both the gospel market in Portuguese (in Brazil and abroad), as the Latin market. Cristina Mel has also produced, with special focus on whole albums, dedicated exclusively to children.

Discography

External links

References

1964 births
Living people
20th-century Brazilian women singers
20th-century Brazilian singers
Brazilian gospel singers
Musicians from Rio de Janeiro (city)
21st-century Brazilian women singers
21st-century Brazilian singers